The Central Amazon Ecological Corridor is an ecological corridor in the state of Amazonas, Brazil, that connects a number of conservation units in the Amazon rainforest. The objective is to maintain genetic connectivity between the protected areas without penalizing the local people, where possible using participatory planning that involves all affected actors.

Location

The corridor covers parts of the Solimões and Negro river basins, mostly in the state of Amazonas but with a small portion in the state of Pará.
The main urban centers in the corridor are the cities of Manaus, Manacapuru and Tefé.
If indigenous territories are included, over 70% of the corridor was contained in protected areas in 2005.

The corridor is of great ecological importance.
It includes parts of several major rivers with different aquatic environments such as the Jutaí, Japurá, Juruá, Solimões, Tefé and Rio Negro, and many smaller rivers, streams, bayous, and várzea and terra firma lakes.
It covers formations from the Tertiary period with terra firma and black water and Pleistocene and Holocene floodplains formed by the deposit of white water sediments.
Unlike other ecological corridors in Brazil there is very high connectivity between the conservation units, so genetic transfer has not been strangled by human disturbance in the unprotected areas.

History

Implementation of protected reserves and parks has not guaranteed sustainability of natural systems due in part to lack of supporting infrastructure and staff, to the isolation of the protected units as islands, and to lack of involvement of actors within and around the protected unit.
In an attempt to address this, ecological corridors are assembled from protected areas, indigenous lands and areas with different types of land use, forming a connected whole.
The management approach is participatory, involving government and non-government actors.
The Central Amazon Corridor and the Central Atlantic Forest Ecological Corridor were prioritized to test and address different conditions in the two main forest biomes in Brazil.
Lessons learned would be applied in creation of other corridors.

The agreement to implement the Central Amazon Ecological Corridor  was signed on 28 December 2001, and came into effect on 15 March 2002 when the required conditions had been met.
The overall goal of the corridor was to retain the integrity of the large area covered by the corridor as far as possible without penalizing the local people.
If protected area mosaics are shown to be compatible with the basic corridor design, a participatory process for internal zoning of the corridor may be established within the existing legislation. 
The secondary objectives of the corridor therefore aim at integrated management and participation by different social sectors in addition to those always considered in ecological corridors projects.

An agreement to cooperate on restoration and environmental recovery was signed on 24 August 2010 between the Ministry of the Environment and the University of Amazonas Foundation.
The purpose was to define methods of ensuring support for restoring degraded areas in the ecological corridors, enabling and involving the actors in the native species forestry production chain, and protecting the biodiversity of the corridor through participatory management and social mobilization in the areas between conservation units, and through studies and surveys.

Actors
Implementation of the corridor involves actors from all levels of government and from civil society.

National level
At the national level the actors include:

 Ministry of the Environment (Department of the Amazon Legal) 
 Brazilian Institute of Environment and Renewable Natural Resources (IBAMA) 
 Fundação Nacional do Índio (FUNAI – National Indian Foundation)
 Brazilian Agricultural Research Corporation (EMBRAPA)
 National Institute of Amazonian Research (INPA)
 National Institute for Space Research (INPE)
 Instituto Nacional de Colonização e Reforma Agrária (INCRA – National Institute for Colonization and Agrarian Reform)
 Federal universities of the region
 Superintendência do Desenvolvimento da Amazônia (SUDAM – Superintendency of Development for the Amazon)
 Eletronorte
 National Council for Scientific and Technological Development (CNPq)
 Museu Paraense Emílio Goeldi (Goeldi Museum)
 The media and environmental NGOs

Regional level
At a regional level actors include:

 IBAMA Superintendence of the State of Amazonas 
 Instituto de Proteção Ambiental do Amazonas (IPAAM – State of Amazonas Institute of Environmental Protection)
 Local private sector, mainly linked to Ecotourism
 Empresa Amazonense de Turismo (EMANTUR)
 Agrarian Development Institute of the State of Amazonas (IDAM)
 Landowners
 Instituto de Terras do Amazonas (ITERAM)
 Superintendência da Zona Franca de Manaus (SUFRAMA)
 University of Amazonas Foundation (FUA) and local media and local NGOs.
 Regional media and NGOs.

Local level
Local actors include local civil society associations such as fishing communities, loggers' associations and other groups dedicated to the exploitation of natural resources, as well as:

 The Church
 Municipal authorities, 
 Units of the National Health Foundation (FNS / Sucam)
 Decentralized units of Amazonas state government and its departments
 Rural workers' union
 IBAMA posts (POCOFs)
 Local media and lNGOs

Conservation Units

The Central Amazon Ecological Corridor connects the following conservation units:

Notes

Sources

Ecological corridors of Brazil
Protected areas of Amazonas (Brazilian state)
2002 establishments in Brazil